In Bad Taste is a 2000 documentary film from Steve Yeager following the cinematic career of American filmmaker John Waters, and includes interviews with Waters and his ensemble cast, known as the Dreamlanders.

Cast
Steve Yeager
John Waters
Divine
Steve Buscemi
Johnny Depp 
Ricki Lake
Jean Hill 
Danny Mills
Edith Massey 
Mink Stole 
Susan Lowe
Sam Waterston
Kathleen Turner
David Lochary
Channing Wilroy
Jeanine Basinger   
Debbie Harry    
Patricia Hearst  
Lloyd Kaufman  
David O. Russell   
Nick Zedd

External links

2000 films
American documentary films
American independent films
Documentary films about film directors and producers
Documentary films about LGBT film
Films shot in Baltimore
2000 LGBT-related films
John Waters
2000s English-language films
2000s American films